Micro Labs Limited (stylized as MICRO LABS) is an Indian pharmaceutical company based in Bangalore. It manufactures healthcare products.

History 
It was founded by the late Shri G.C. Surana in 1973. Dilip Surana is Chairman and managing director of Micro Labs.

In July 2022, the Indian Income Tax Department conducted search and seizure operations at the company's headquarters, following allegations that the company had been illegally debiting its books with free gifts for doctors and other medical professionals, such as travel expenses and gifts, to boost sales of their product Dolo-650. These gifts were allegedly debited under accounting entries such as "Promotion and Propaganda", "Seminars and Symposiums" and "Medical Advisories".

See also 
 Pharmaceutical industry in India
 Pharmaceutical

References

External links 
 

Pharmaceutical companies of India
Indian companies established in 1973
Biotechnology companies of India